Bayanihan Park is a park in Clark Freeport Zone, Angeles City, Philippines.

Background
Bayanihan Park is geographically located in the city of Angeles, Philippines.

It is formerly known as Astro Park. One of the major landmarks of the city of Angeles, the Salakot Arch, is situated inside the park. The structure's roof resembles that of a salakot, a traditional hat. It was built during the administration of then-President Ferdinand Marcos to commemorate the revision of the Military Bases Agreement between the Philippine and United States government in 1979. The deal recognized Philippine sovereignty over the Clark Air Base which was then controlled by the United States. The Salakot Arch was formerly situated inside the Clark Air Base (which was later converted to the Clark Freeport Zone) but was later relocated inside the park. The park was renamed as the Bayanihan Park when the Clark Airbase was converted to a Philippine-controlled base.

The park serves as an area for recreational and sports activities and hosts basketball and volleyball courts.

In November 30, 2018, the park serves as the venue for the countdown ceremony of the 2019 Southeast Asian Games. A  structure consisting of 11 rings representing the 11 participating countries were also built inside the park grounds for the countdown ceremony.

References

Parks in the Philippines
Tourist attractions in Angeles City
Clark Freeport Zone